Lee Roy Robbins (February 11, 1922 – April 8, 1968) was an American professional basketball player. He spent two seasons in the Basketball Association of America (BAA) as a member of the Providence Steam Rollers (1947–49). He attended the University of Colorado.

Robbins was found shot and killed in Billings, Montana on April 8, 1968. Gary L. Quigg was convicted of killing Robbins after Robbins discovered him breaking into his car. Quigg was sentenced to life in prison but was paroled in 2006.

BAA career statistics

Regular season

References

External links

1922 births
1968 deaths
American men's basketball players
Basketball players from Dallas
Colorado Buffaloes men's basketball players
Forwards (basketball)
Providence Steamrollers players
Undrafted National Basketball Association players
Deaths by firearm in Montana
People murdered in Montana
American murder victims
Male murder victims